Beauty and the Beat! is a 1959 album (see 1959 in music) by Peggy Lee, accompanied by the George Shearing Quintet.

Sleeve notes
The notes on the back cover of the original 1959 LP are in the exaggerated style that was common at the time and present the story that the recording was live:

1959 Track listing
 "Do I Love You?" (Cole Porter) – 3:03
 "I Lost My Sugar in Salt Lake City" (Johnny Lange, Leon Rene) – 2:27
 "If Dreams Come True" (Benny Goodman, Irving Mills, Edgar Sampson) – 2:20
 "All Too Soon" (Duke Ellington, Carl Sigman) – 2:35
 "Mambo in Miami" (Armando Peraza) – 1:42
 "Isn't It Romantic?" (Richard Rodgers, Lorenz Hart) – 2:54
 "Blue Prelude" (Joe Bishop, Gordon Jenkins) – 2:06
 "You Came a Long Way from St. Louis" (John Benson Brooks, Bob Russell) – 2:50
 "Always True to You in My Fashion" (Porter) – 1:58
 "There'll Be Another Spring" (Peggy Lee, Hubie Wheeler) – 2:23
 "Get Out of Town" (Porter) – 1:58
 "Satin Doll" (Ellington, Johnny Mercer, Billy Strayhorn) – 2:47

Personnel
 George Shearing – piano
 Peggy Lee – vocals
 Ray Alexander – vibraphone
 Toots Thielemans – guitar
 Jimmy Bond – double bass
 Roy Haynes – drums
 Armando Peraza – conga

Remaster
This recording was re-issued in 2003 as a CD on the Capitol Jazz label and was described as 'Newly restored from the original studio session tapes'. It was a remixed and remastered version of the original 3-track tapes. The remaster also contained two additional tracks from the studio session, but not included on the original vinyl release - 'Nobody's Heart' (Rodgers and Hart) as track 13 and 'Don't Ever Leave Me' (Oscar Hammerstein II, Jerome Kern) as track 14.
The description on the CD names different players from those noted above for the 1959 vinyl version.
The personnel are given as:
 Peggy Lee - Vocals (Tracks 1-4, 7-11, 13,14)
 George Shearing- Piano
 Ray Alexander - Vibes (Tracks 1-12)
 Toots Thielemans - Guitar (Tracks 1-12) NB. Name wrongly spelled as Toots Thielmanns on CD cover notes.
 Carl Pruitt - Bass (Tracks 1-13)
 Ray Mosca - Drums (Tracks 1-13)
 Armando Peraza - Conga, Percussion (Tracks 5, 9)

Other recording and production information is given on the cover notes as follows:
 Produced by David Cavanaugh, recorded on May 28–30, 1959
Re-issue produced by Cy Godfrey and Michael Cuscuna
Remixed from the original 3-track tapes and remastered in 24 bit by Ron McMaster.

There is also a descriptive note, explaining the subterfuge of claiming that the original issue was of a live recording:This album was originally released with overdubbed applause and background ambience and issued as recorded at the 1959 Miami Disk Jockey's (sic) Convention. It was actually recorded in the studio shortly before or after the actual appearance and is presented here in its pure state and greatly improved fidelity. Tracks 13 and 14, recorded at these sessions, were not included on the original LP.

References

1959 albums
Capitol Records albums
George Shearing albums
Peggy Lee albums
Albums produced by Dave Cavanaugh
Collaborative albums